Roxbury is a township in Morris County, in the U.S. state of New Jersey. As of the 2020 United States census, the township's population was 22,950, a decrease of 374 (−1.6%) from the 2010 census count of 23,324, which in turn reflected a decline of 559 (−2.3%) from the 23,883 counted in the 2000 census.

Roxbury was formed on December 24, 1740, from portions of Morris Township. It was formally incorporated by the Township Act of 1798 of the New Jersey Legislature on February 21, 1798, as part of the state's initial group of 104 townships. Portions of the township were taken to form Mendham Township (March 29, 1749), Washington Township (April 2, 1798), Chester Township (April 1, 1799), Jefferson Township (February 11, 1804), Mount Olive Township (March 22, 1871), Mount Arlington (November 3, 1890) and Netcong (October 23, 1894).

Tom's Diner was featured in the music video from Time After Time by Cyndi Lauper.

Geography
According to the United States Census Bureau, the township had a total area of 21.98 square miles (56.93 km2), including 20.85 square miles (54.01 km2) of land and 1.13 square miles (2.93 km2) of water (5.14%).

Kenvil (2010 Census population of 3,009), Landing, Ledgewood, Lower Berkshire Valley, Port Morris, and Succasunna (2010 Census population of 9,152) are unincorporated communities and census-designated places (CDPs) within the township. Previously, as of the 2000 United States Census, the Succasunna and Kenvil communities had been consolidated as Succasunna-Kenvil, which had a 2000 Census population of 12,569.

Other unincorporated communities, localities and place names located partially or completely within the township include Baker Mill Pond, Bertrand Island, Carys, Lake Junction, Lake Rogerene, Port Morris Landing, Rustic and Shippenport.

Roxbury borders the municipalities of Chester Township, Jefferson Township, Mine Hill Township, Mount Arlington, Mount Olive Township, Netcong, Randolph Township, Wharton in Morris County; and both Hopatcong and Stanhope in Sussex County.

Demographics

2010 census

The Census Bureau's 2006–2010 American Community Survey showed that (in 2010 inflation-adjusted dollars) median household income was $95,676 (with a margin of error of +/− $5,626) and the median family income was $110,538 (+/− $6,156). Males had a median income of $75,417 (+/− $7,299) versus $47,556 (+/− $4,775) for females. The per capita income for the borough was $38,576 (+/− $2,305). About 2.5% of families and 3.6% of the population were below the poverty line, including 4.0% of those under age 18 and 5.2% of those age 65 or over.

2000 census
As of the 2000 United States census there were 23,883 people, 8,364 households, and 6,532 families residing in the township. The population density was 1,117.4 people per square mile (431.5/km2). There were 8,550 housing units at an average density of 400.0 per square mile (154.5/km2). The racial makeup of the township was 92.57% White, 1.91% Black or African American, 0.15% Native American, 3.58% Asian, 0.07% Pacific Islander, 0.68% from other races, and 1.04% from two or more races. 4.83% of the population were Hispanic or Latino of any race.

There were 8,364 households, out of which 39.7% had children under the age of 18 living with them, 66.8% were married couples living together, 8.7% had a female householder with no husband present, and 21.9% were non-families. 17.9% of all households were made up of individuals, and 6.5% had someone living alone who was 65 years of age or older.  The average household size was 2.84 and the average family size was 3.25.

In the township the population was spread out, with 27.0% under the age of 18, 6.1% from 18 to 24, 31.4% from 25 to 44, 25.7% from 45 to 64, and 9.9% who were 65 years of age or older. The median age was 38 years. For every 100 females, there were 95.6 males. For every 100 females age 18 and over, there were 92.0 males.

The median income for a household in the township was $72,982, and the median income for a family was $83,409. Males had a median income of $59,488 versus $36,353 for females. The per capita income for the township was $30,174.  About 2.1% of families and 2.7% of the population were below the poverty line, including 2.2% of those under age 18 and 3.1% of those age 65 or over.

Crime
According to the 2008 New Jersey State Police Uniform Crime Report, crime had declined in Roxbury versus 2007 data. There was an uptick in crime for 2009.

Economy
Ledgewood Mall (with a gross leasable area of ) and Roxbury Mall (with a GLA of ) are regional shopping malls located within the township.

Government

Local government
Roxbury operates under the Council-Manager form of Government under the Faulkner Act. The township is one of 42 municipalities (of the 564) statewide that use this form of government. The Township Council is comprised of seven elected officials, with three seats elected from the entire township at-large and one elected from each of the four wards. Council members are elected for four-year terms on a staggered basis in partisan elections held in odd-numbered years, with the three at-large seats selected together and the four ward seats up for election at the same time two years later. The mayor and deputy mayor are chosen from within the council by the members of the council at a reorganization meeting held each year during the first week in January to serve one-year terms of office. The manager is responsible for the day-to-day operations associated with all municipal activities. The manager directs, administers and coordinates the activities of the municipality in full support of policies, goals and objectives established by the governing body.

, the members of Roxbury's Township Council are Mayor Jim Rilee (R, term on council ends December 31, 2025 / term as mayor ends 2022; at large), Deputy Mayor Jacqueline "Jaki" Albrect (R, term on council ends 2023 / term as deputy mayor ends 2022; Ward 2), Tom Carey (R, 2023; Ward 4), Robert DeFillippo (R, 2025; at large), Mark Crowley (R, 2025; at large), Fred Hall (R, 2023; Ward 3) and Shawn Potillo (R, 2023; Ward 1 – elected to serve an unexpired term).

In April 2021, the Township Council selected Shawn Potillo from a list of three candidates submitted by the Republican municipal committee to the fill the Ward 1 council seat expiring in December 2022 that had been held by Richard Zoschak until his death the previous month. Potillo served on an interim basis until the November 2021 general election, when he was chosen to serve the balance of the term of office.

Roxbury Mount Arlington Study Commission 
In March 2014, members of the public petitioned the New Jersey Department of Community Affairs to form the Roxbury Mount Arlington Study Commission to consider a possible consolidation of Roxbury and the neighboring municipality of Mount Arlington. In March 2015, the commission was formed with five members and two alternates from each municipality. If the commission votes to recommend a merger, the decision would have to be ratified by a referendum of the voters in each community.

Federal, state and county representation
Roxbury is located in the 7th Congressional District and is part of New Jersey's 25th state legislative district.

 

Morris County is governed by a Board of County Commissioners comprised of seven members who are elected at-large in partisan elections to three-year terms on a staggered basis, with either one or three seats up for election each year as part of the November general election. Actual day-to-day operation of departments is supervised by County Administrator, John Bonanni. , Morris County's Commissioners are
Commissioner Director Tayfun Selen (R, Chatham Township, term as commissioner ends December 31, 2023; term as director ends 2022),
Commissioner Deputy Director John Krickus (R, Washington Township, term as commissioner ends 2024; term as deputy director ends 2022),
Douglas Cabana (R, Boonton Township, 2022), 
Kathryn A. DeFillippo (R, Roxbury, 2022),
Thomas J. Mastrangelo (R, Montville, 2022),
Stephen H. Shaw (R, Mountain Lakes, 2024) and
Deborah Smith (R, Denville, 2024).
The county's constitutional officers are the County Clerk and County Surrogate (both elected for five-year terms of office) and the County Sheriff (elected for a three-year term). , they are 
County Clerk Ann F. Grossi (R, Parsippany–Troy Hills, 2023),
Sheriff James M. Gannon (R, Boonton Township, 2022) and
Surrogate Heather Darling (R, Roxbury, 2024).

Politics
As of March 2011, there were a total of 15,471 registered voters in Roxbury, of which 3,010 (19.5%) were registered as Democrats, 5,307 (34.3%) were registered as Republicans and 7,145 (46.2%) were registered as Unaffiliated. There were 9 voters registered as Libertarians or Greens.

In the 2012 presidential election, Republican Mitt Romney received 59.9% of the vote (6,536 cast), ahead of Democrat Barack Obama with 39.2% (4,282 votes), and other candidates with 0.9% (100 votes), among the 10,996 ballots cast by the township's 16,262 registered voters (78 ballots were spoiled), for a turnout of 67.6%. In the 2008 presidential election, Republican John McCain received 58.3% of the vote (7,182 cast), ahead of Democrat Barack Obama with 40.2% (4,952 votes) and other candidates with 0.9% (112 votes), among the 12,321 ballots cast by the township's 15,934 registered voters, for a turnout of 77.3%. In the 2004 presidential election, Republican George W. Bush received 61.5% of the vote (7,270 ballots cast), outpolling Democrat John Kerry with 37.3% (4,411 votes) and other candidates with 0.7% (113 votes), among the 11,816 ballots cast by the township's 15,469 registered voters, for a turnout percentage of 76.4.

In the 2013 gubernatorial election, Republican Chris Christie received 69.9% of the vote (4,996 cast), ahead of Democrat Barbara Buono with 27.9% (1,996 votes), and other candidates with 2.2% (154 votes), among the 7,267 ballots cast by the township's 16,060 registered voters (121 ballots were spoiled), for a turnout of 45.2%. In the 2009 gubernatorial election, Republican Chris Christie received 65.3% of the vote (5,306 ballots cast), ahead of  Democrat Jon Corzine with 25.6% (2,081 votes), Independent Chris Daggett with 8.0% (646 votes) and other candidates with 0.6% (45 votes), among the 8,120 ballots cast by the township's 15,686 registered voters, yielding a 51.8% turnout.

Education
The Roxbury School District serves public school students in kindergarten through twelfth grade. As of the 2018–19 school year, the district, comprised of seven schools, had an enrollment of 3,551 students and 328.1 classroom teachers (on an FTE basis), for a student–teacher ratio of 10.8:1. Schools in the district consists of the following (with 2018–19 enrollment data from the National Center for Education Statistics) are 
Franklin Elementary School with 332 students in grades K–4, 
Jefferson Elementary School with 369 students in grades K–4, 
Kennedy Elementary School with 254 students in grades K–4, 
Nixon Elementary School with 258 students in grades K–4, 
Lincoln / Roosevelt School with 480 students in grades 5–6, 
Eisenhower Middle School with 534 students in grades 7–8 and 
Roxbury High School with 1,297 students in grades 9–12.

The district's high school serves students from Roxbury, as well as Mount Arlington, who attend as part of a sending/receiving relationship with the Mount Arlington School District.

Established in 1963, St. Therese School is a Catholic school operated under the auspices of the Roman Catholic Diocese of Paterson.

Transportation

Roads and highways

Interstate 80, U.S. Route 46, U.S. Route 206, Route 10 and Route 183 all pass through the township.

Public transportation
The NJ Transit Lake Hopatcong station is served by the Morristown Line and the Montclair-Boonton Line, with service to Hoboken Terminal or to Pennsylvania Station in Midtown Manhattan via Midtown Direct which requires a transfer at Dover or Montclair State University.

Morristown & Erie Railway's Chester Branch and High Bridge Branch freight lines run through the township on weekdays.

Port Morris was the starting point for the Lackawanna Cut-Off, an engineering marvel constructed by the Delaware, Lackawanna and Western Railroad between 1908 and 1911. NJ Transit is considering plans to restore passenger service on the route between the Pocono Mountains in Pennsylvania and Hoboken Terminal.

NJ Transit provides limited local bus service on the 875 route between the Ledgewood Mall, Dover and Morristown.

Lakeland Bus Lines stops in the Landing section of the township providing service to and from the Port Authority Bus Terminal in Midtown Manhattan.

In popular culture
Tom's Diner was featured in the music video from Time After Time by Cyndi Lauper.

Notable people

People who were born in, residents of, or otherwise closely associated with Roxbury include:

 Trevor Baptiste (born 1996), professional lacrosse midfielder for the Boston Cannons
 Dylan Castanheira (born 1995), soccer player who plays as a goalkeeper for Fort Lauderdale CF in USL League One
 Harry "A" Chesler (1898–1981), entrepreneur behind the first comic book "packager" of the late-1930s to 1940s Golden Age of Comic Books, supplying comics features and complete comic books to publishers testing the waters of the emerging medium
 BettyLou DeCroce (born 1952), politician who has represented the 26th Legislative District in the New Jersey General Assembly from 2012 to 2022, after being appointed to fill the seat following the death of her husband, Alex DeCroce
 Philemon Dickerson (1788–1862), 12th Governor of New Jersey
 Roberta Groner (born 1978), athlete competing in long-distance events
 Leo Warren Jenkins (1913–1989), educator who served as the sixth president and chancellor of what is now East Carolina University
 Doug Miller (born 1969), soccer player and coach
 Paige Monaghan (born 1996), professional soccer player who currently plays for Sky Blue FC of the National Women's Soccer League
 Dave Moore (born 1969), football player who played for the Buffalo Bills, Miami Dolphins and Tampa Bay Buccaneers
 Karen Ann Quinlan (1954–1985), important figure in the history of the right to die controversy in the United States
 Jetur R. Riggs (1809–1869), represented  in the U.S. representative from 1859 to 1861
 Tito Santana (born 1953), former WWF wrestler

References

External links

Township website
Roxbury School District

School Data for the Roxbury School District, National Center for Education Statistics
History of Roxbury, New Jersey

 
1740 establishments in New Jersey
Faulkner Act (council–manager)
Populated places established in 1740
Townships in Morris County, New Jersey